Boundary Island is located in the Peel Inlet section of the Peel-Harvey Estuarine System, just south of Mandurah, Western Australia, about  south of Perth.

References

Islands of the Perth region (Western Australia)